Thornton is a civil parish and a village in Sefton, Merseyside, England.  It contains four buildings that are recorded in the National Heritage List for England as designated listed buildings, all of which are listed at Grade II.  This grade is the lowest of the three gradings given to listed buildings and is applied to "buildings of national importance and special interest".  The parish is partly residential and partly rural, and the listed buildings consist of two crosses, the bases of which are ancient, a set of stocks, and a farmhouse.

References

Citations

Sources

Listed buildings in Merseyside
Lists of listed buildings in Merseyside